Potency may refer to:

 Potency (pharmacology), a measure of the activity of a drug in a biological system
 Virility
 Cell potency, a measure of the differentiation potential of stem cells
 In homeopathic dilutions, potency is a measure of how dilute a substance is
 Potency in philosophy is a specific potentiality in Aristotle's Theory of Potentiality and actuality, or "Act and Potency"; e.g., since the material, stone, is potentially a statue, it has a potency for statuehood, of which the form of any statue is the "act"

See also
Potent (disambiguation)
Potens (disambiguation)